"Israelites" is a song written by Desmond Dekker and Leslie Kong that became a hit for Dekker's group, Desmond Dekker & The Aces, reaching the top of the charts in numerous countries in 1969.  Sung in Jamaican creole, some of the song's lyrics were not readily understood by many British and American listeners at the time of its release.  Despite this, the single was the first UK reggae #1 and among the first to reach the US top ten (peaking at #9).  It combined the Rastafarian religion with rude boy concerns, to make what has been described as a "timeless masterpiece that knew no boundaries".

Song

Origin and lyrics
Originally issued in Jamaica as "Poor Me Israelites", it remains the best known Jamaican reggae hit to reach the United States Hot 100's top 10, and was written almost two years after Dekker first made his mark with the rude boy song "007 (Shanty Town)". Dekker composed the song after overhearing an argument: "I was walking in the park, eating popcorn. I heard a couple arguing about money. She was saying she needs money and he was saying the work he was doing was not giving him enough. I related to those things and began to sing a little song: 'You get up in the morning and you're slaving for bread.' By the time I got home, it was complete." The title has been the source of speculation, but most settle on the Rastafarian Movement's association with the Twelve Tribes of Israel. In the 1960s, Jamaican Rastafarians were largely marginalized as "cultish" and ostracized from the larger society, including by the more conservative Christian church in Kingston. Destitute ("slaving for bread") and unkempt ("Shirt dem a-tear up, trousers a-go"), some Rastafarians were tempted to a life of crime ("I don't want to end up like Bonnie and Clyde"). The song is a lament of this condition.

Musical structure
The vocal melody is syncopated and is centred on the tone of B flat.  The chords of the guitar accompaniment are played on the offbeat and move through the tonic chord [B flat], the subdominant [E flat], the dominant [F], and the occasional [D flat], viz, [B flat] - [E flat] - [F] - [B flat] - [D flat]. It was one of the first reggae songs to become an international hit, despite Dekker's strong Jamaican accent which made his lyrics difficult to understand for many listeners outside Jamaica.

Impact
Despite "Israelites" being recorded and released in 1968, the Uni 45 discography shows its cataloguing in 1969.  In June 1969 it reached the Top Ten in the United States, peaking at #9 on the Billboard Hot 100 singles chart. It hit #1 in the United Kingdom, the Netherlands, Jamaica, South Africa, Canada, Sweden and West Germany.

"Israelites" brought a Jamaican beat to the British top 40 for the first time since Dekker's #14 hit "007 (Shanty Town)" in 1967.

The disc was released in the UK in March 1969 and was #1 for one week, selling over 250,000 copies.
A global million sales was reported in June 1969.

Follow-up and reissues
Dekker had two more UK Top 10 hits over the next year, "It Miek" and his cover of Jimmy Cliff's song "You Can Get It If You Really Want".

Dekker recorded on the Pyramid record label, and when its catalogue was acquired by Cactus Records in 1975, "Israelites" was re-issued in a first-time stereo mix.  Just over six years after the original release, the song again reached a Top Ten position in the United Kingdom.

In 1980, Dekker released a new recording of the song on UK label Stiff Records, performed in an uptempo Two Tone style. It was taken from an album of similar re-recordings of his old hits, Black & Dekker.

Appearance in other media
The song has appeared in numerous movies and television programs, including the soundtracks of the 1989 American film Drugstore Cowboy and the 2010 British film Made in Dagenham.

On November 3, 2019, "Israelites" was prominently featured in the third episode of HBO's Watchmen. Potentially because of this usage, the song charted again, entering the Billboard Digital Reggae Song Sales Chart at #2.

Charts

Weekly charts

Year-end charts

Certifications

See also
UK No.1 Hits of 1969
List of number-one singles from the 1960s (UK)
Number-one hits of 1969 (Germany)
List of 1960s one-hit wonders in the United States
Dutch Top 40 number-one hits of 1969

References

Bibliography
 Joel Whitburn's Top Pop Singles 1955-1990 - 

1969 singles
UK Singles Chart number-one singles
Number-one singles in Germany
Reggae songs
Songs written by Leslie Kong
Songs written by Desmond Dekker
Song recordings produced by Leslie Kong
Desmond Dekker songs
Madness (band) songs
1968 songs
Uni Records singles